Pyrgocythara astricta, common name the tied mangelia, is a species of sea snail, a marine gastropod mollusk in the family Mangeliidae.

This species is a nomen dubium.

Description
The length of the shell attains 20 mm.
 
(Original description) The shell is somewhat fusiformly ovate. The spire is rather short, the sutures deep. The shell is longitudinally ribbed, with numerous ribs rather close-set. The color of the shell is whitish, encircled with a narrow brown zone.

Distribution
This species occurs off Florida, USA

References

External links
 
 Reeve, L. A. (1846). Monograph of the genus Mangelia. In: Conchologia Iconica, or, illustrations of the shells of molluscous animals, vol. 3, pl. 1-8 and unpaginated text. L. Reeve & Co., London
 

astricta
Gastropods described in 1846